The Elgin automobile was manufactured by Elgin Motor Car Corporation in Argo, Illinois, from 1916 to 1923, and by Elgin Motors, Inc., in Indianapolis from 1923 to 1924.

Elgin Motor Car Corporation was formed in 1916 by several executives from the Elgin Watch Company. The company was based on the former New Era Motor Car Company of Joliet. Upon being taken over, the erstwhile company was moved in its entirety to Elgin, where the new company had a 210,000 square foot factory waiting on 13 acres.  This would allow room for future expansion.

The Elgin achieved success in the Midwest endurance races in which it was entered. Advertising slogans included "The Car of the Hour" and "Built Like A Watch", alluding to the roots of the founders.

Dividends of 10% paid in stock in July 1916 and cash dividends of 5% in July 1920 proved so popular with stockholders that stockholder meetings had to be held in a tent.  Sales of over $7 million in 1920 made that year the company's best ever. The recession of the early 1920s damaged the company, as it did so many other U.S. auto firms of the time. The company issued $500,000 in bonds to pay off loans and for working capital.  Elgin Motors, Inc., was formed by stockholders in June 1923. J.H. McDuffee, formerly of Willys-Overland and Cole, was chosen as president and general manager. It was at this time that the firm was relocated to Indianapolis. The company moved into the former home of Federal Motor Works. By June of the next year, the company was already bankrupt, ending the marque as a whole.

Notes

References
 Kimes, Beverly Rae and Clark Jr, Henry Austin. "Standard Catalog of American Cars: 1805–1942." (Third Edition). Iola, WI: Krause Publications. 1996.

Brass Era vehicles
Vintage vehicles
Defunct motor vehicle manufacturers of the United States
Motor vehicle manufacturers based in Indiana
Motor vehicle manufacturers based in Illinois